Nicolás Marcelo Stefanelli (born 22 November 1994) is an Argentine professional footballer who plays a striker for Major League Soccer club Inter Miami.

Club career

Defensa y Justicia 
In 2014, Defensa y Justicia were promoted for the first time ever to the Argentine Primera División. During the following pre-season, in July 2014, Stefanelli was moved up to the A squad from the U19 squad. It was, however, decided that he would benefit from being loaned out, so he would have to wait another 18 months for his debut in the first tier.

Villa Dálmine 
On 15 August 2014 Stefanelli started a loan spell at Villa Dálmine, contributing to their promotion from Primera B Metropolitana, the third tier of Argentine football, to Primera B Nacional, the second tier. His league debut came on 1 September 2014 in a 1-0 win over Club Atlético Atlanta. He came on as a substitute in the 75th minute, replacing Gabriel Sanabria. He scored his first goal for Dálmine three weeks later in a 1-1 draw with Chacarita Juniors. The goal came in the 75th minute, six minutes after he had been brought on off the bench.

Return to Defensa y Justicia
On 1 January 2016 Stefanelli returned to Defensa and the Argentine Primera Division. During 18 months he scored a total of 11 goals in 35 appearances. The club finished fourth in Zone 2 of the 2016 Argentine Primera División, which qualified them for the 2017 Copa Sudamericana. Defensa y Justicia finished tenth in the 2016–17 season and were therefore qualified for the 2018 Copa Sudamericana.

AIK 
On 1 July 2017 AIK, of the Swedish first tier Allsvenskan, announced that they had signed Stefanelli on a three-and-a-half-year contract, from 15 July 2017 to 31 December 2020. He made his Allsvenskan debut on 16 July 2017, a 1–0 home win against IFK Norrköping. Stefanelli was praised by both pundits and AIK fans afterwards, even though he didn't manage to score. On 1 October 2017 he scored a hattrick when AIK won 5–2 win against Elfsborg.

Loan to Anorthosis Famagusta
On 18 January 2019 it was announced that Stefanelli had signed a loan deal with Anorthosis Famagusta in the Cypriot First Division.

Return to AIK 
On 26 February 2021 AIK confirmed that Stefanelli returned back to the club.

Inter Miami
On 5 January 2023, Stefanelli joined Major League Soccer side Inter Miami on a two-year deal.

Personal life 
Stefanelli is a dual national; he holds an Italian EU passport as well as an Argentine passport. He grew up and went to school in Quilmes, Argentina. Stefanelli is nicknamed "Chicho" in Argentina and "Nico" by his Swedish teammates.

Career statistics

Honours
AIK
 Allsvenskan: 2018

References

External links

Living people
1994 births
AIK Fotboll players
Argentine footballers
Defensa y Justicia footballers
Villa Dálmine footballers
Anorthosis Famagusta F.C. players
Unión La Calera footballers
Inter Miami CF players
People from Quilmes
People from Buenos Aires Province
Argentine Primera División players
Primera Nacional players
Primera B Metropolitana players
Allsvenskan players
Cypriot First Division players
Chilean Primera División players
Expatriate footballers in Sweden
Expatriate footballers in Cyprus
Expatriate footballers in Chile
Argentine expatriate sportspeople in Sweden
Argentine expatriate sportspeople in the United States
Argentine expatriate footballers
Argentine people of Italian descent
Association football forwards
Sportspeople from Buenos Aires Province